Herbert Ingrey (December 9, 1886 – January 31, 1968) was a politician from Alberta, Canada. He was born at Leyton.

Herbert was elected in the 1935 Alberta general election for the Alberta Social Credit Party defeating Independent incumbent Fred Moyer.

Herbert served 1 term in the Legislative Assembly of Alberta as a back bencher.

External links
Herbert Ingrey Family
Legislative Assembly of Alberta Members Listing

References 

Alberta Social Credit Party MLAs
1968 deaths
1872 births